The painted tody-flycatcher (Todirostrum pictum) is a species of bird in the family Tyrannidae, the tyrant flycatchers. It is found in the Guianas of French Guiana, Guyana and Suriname; also eastern-southeastern Venezuela and the northeastern states of Brazil of the Amazon Basin.

Its natural habitats are subtropical or tropical moist lowland forests and heavily degraded former forest.

The painted tody-flycatcher is a medium to small bird, with a bright sulphur-yellow breast and small areas of white-black sides; it has a jet-black head, white on the upper neck, and mostly black wings with yellow feathers, and some white feathers. It has a medium to long, strong black bill, and a white spot above the cere between the eyes.

Range in the Guianas, northeastern Amazon Basin

The range of the painted tody-flycatcher is centered on the Guianas, and the Guiana Shield countries bordering the northeast Amazon Basin. The contiguous range is only north of the Amazon River and extends northwestwards into southeast and eastern Venezuela.

The range in Venezuela is limited to the upstream regions of the Caribbean north-flowing Orinoco River; it occurs on the downstream, eastern banks of the Orinoco River drainage to the Caribbean, away from the river proper by about 100 km. In Venezuela's eastern neighboring Roraima state Brazil, the range is complete; the area to the west, extreme northeast Amazonas state, the painted tody-flycatcher's range is limited to the northeast banks of the Rio Negro.

At the Amazon River outlet to the Atlantic Ocean, the species' range is all of the northeastern state of Amapá with neighboring French Guiana and the Atlantic Ocean.

References

External links
Painted tody-flycatcher photo gallery VIREO Photo-High Res

painted tody-flycatcher
Birds of the Guianas
Birds of the Amazon Basin
Birds of Venezuela
painted tody-flycatcher
painted tody-flycatcher
Taxonomy articles created by Polbot